The Convenient Marriage is a Georgian romance novel by Georgette Heyer set in 1776. It is the first of several Heyer romances where the hero and heroine are married early in the novel, and the plot follows their path to mutual love and understanding. Later examples include Friday's Child and April Lady.

Plot summary

When the wealthy and eligible Earl of Rule, 35 years old, proposes marriage to Elizabeth Winwood, she resigns herself to marrying against her will to rescue the fortunes of her impoverished family. Her youngest sister Horatia, a 17-year-old  young woman with a stammer, decides to take matters into her own hands, meeting with the Earl and persuading him to marry her instead of Elizabeth and thus leaving Elizabeth free to marry her true (but far less eligible) love. Part of the deal she proposes to Rule is that she will not interfere with his activities after their marriage. The wedding takes place and, as tacitly agreed upon, the Earl continues his association with his mistress, Lady Caroline Massey.

Horatia quickly becomes a popular and fashionable society wife, spending vast amounts of money on sensational outfits and at gambling on cards. The Earl is also obliged to make regular financial donations to support Horatia's likeable but debt-ridden brother, Pelham.

Meanwhile, Horatia meets and befriends Lord Lethbridge, who seeks revenge on the Earl for his role in thwarting Lethbridge's attempts to elope with Lady Louisa, Rule's sister, several years earlier. Lethbridge gains Horatia's favour by staging a hold-up of Horatia's carriage, where he heroically rides up to save her from the highwaymen. The Earl warns Horatia against continuing her friendship with Lethbridge; but when he declines to explain why, Horatia disregards his warning. Horatia, who wants to teach her husband a lesson, goes to a masked ball that the Earl had forbidden her from attending, with Lord Lethbridge as her escort. Having heard that Lethbridge is an excellent card player, she attempts to coerce Lethbridge into playing with her and he eventually relents, proposing that they play for a lock of her hair. Before the game can start, Lord Rule (who has followed Horatia disguised in a domino and mask) steps on Horatia's gown, ripping it. While she is away fixing her dress, he incapacitates Lethbridge and dresses himself in Lethbridge's mask and domino. When Horatia returns she doesn't realize her husband has taken Lethbridge's place and they begin to play cards. Horatia is badly beaten and during the game begins to realize the inappropriateness of her actions. When she gives up the lock of her hair, Rule (masquerading as Lethbridge) steals a kiss. Horatia, furious and indignant, rushes out and bumps into Lady Massey, who happens to be at the same ball. The next day Horatia confesses what happened to Rule because she can't bear for him to hear it from Lady Massey. The Earl explains his ruse and Horatia decides to end her friendship with Lethbridge.

Rule, discovering that he has fallen for his own wife, sets out to court her. However, not knowing that the Earl has broken off his relationship with Lady Massey, Horatia is polite but distant. When the Earl leaves town to see to business on his country estate he is disappointed by Horatia's decision to remain in London. Horatia fills her days with entertainments to drown out her feelings of loneliness with her husband away in the country. She attends a ball and upon getting in her carriage to go home, is kidnapped and taken to Lord Lethbridge's house where he intends to ruin her to gain his revenge on Rule. Horatia manages to knock him out and escape but in the process loses a very distinctive brooch from the Earl's heirloom set of jewels.

Horatia calls upon her brother Pelham and his friend, Mr Pommeroy, to restore the brooch to her before Rule returns from his estate. They are unsuccessful because Rule's jealous cousin, Mr Drelincourt, has found the brooch at Lethbridge's house and has immediately set forth for Rule's country estate to share this news. Lethbridge overtakes Drelincourt on the road and wrests the brooch from him. Drelincourt continues on his journey anyway and Rule is furious at his cousin's insinuation that Horatia and Lethbridge are having an affair. Rule sets off back to London, meets Lethbridge on the way and the two men have a swordfight, which Rule wins. Meanwhile, Pelham and his posse plan to hold up Lethbridge's carriage and steal back the brooch. However, they get the carriages confused and accidentally hold up Rule's carriage instead (Lethbridge still being in the country, recovering from his wounds).

Horatia, learning that Pelham has not recovered her brooch is miserable and anxious because she wants to act on her feelings for her husband, but can't while she still believes Lethbridge has the brooch in his possession. She receives an anonymous note saying that her brooch will be restored to her if she attends Vauxhall pavilion at midnight. Horatia, thinking Lethbridge sent the note, makes the meeting with Pelham and Mr Pommeroy hidden nearby in the bushes. She is surprised when the Earl arrives and returns her brooch to her. He confesses his feelings for her and she affirms that they are reciprocated.

Characters

 Lord Marcus Drelincourt, Earl of Rule - 35 year old rake, lives in Grosvenor Square, country estate is Meering
 Miss Elizabeth Winwood - Eldest Winwood sister, 20 years old
 Miss Charlotte Winwood - Middle Winwood sister
 Miss Horatia Winwood - Youngest Winwood sister, 17 years old
 Mr Arnold Gisborne - Lord Rule's secretary
 Mrs Theresa Maulfrey - Cousin of the Winwoods
 Dowager Lady Winwood - Mother of the Winwood sisters and Pelham
 Miss Lane - The Winwood's governess
 Lady Caroline Massey - Lord Rule's mistress and widow of Sir Thomas Massey, a wealthy tradesman
 Lieutenant Edward Heron - Love of Elizabeth Winwood, 22 years old and "of the 10th foot"
 Lord Pelham Winwood, Viscount
 Lord Robert Lethbridge  - Rake and another lover of Lady Caroline Massey
 Sir Roland Pommeroy - Friend of Pelham
 Mr Drelincourt - Cousin and current heir to the Earl of Rule
 Captain Ford - Mr Drelincourt's second
 Mr Francis Puckleton - Mr Drelincourt's second
 Lord Cheston - Lord Winwood's second
 Dr Parvey - Surgeon who attends the duel
 Lady Louisa Quain - Sister of the Earl of Rule
 Mr Cattermole - Landlord of the Sun, at Maidenhead
 Edward 'Ned' Hawkins - Highwayman

References

1934 British novels
Novels by Georgette Heyer
Fiction set in 1776
Heinemann (publisher) books
British romance novels